Adil Serdar Saçan is a famous Turkish police chief who has overseen numerous high-profile investigations. He supervises the Istanbul police force's Anti-Smuggling and Organized Crime Department, which he established in 1998.

He was detained on 23 September 2008 for allegedly being a member of Ergenekon; an illegal gang. In August 2013 he was sentenced to 14 years and six months as part of the Ergenekon trials.

Background and personal life 
He graduated from police academy in 1985 as the top student. He has a master's degree in public administration from Istanbul University.

In June 2008, he and his son Kerim Bedri survived an accident involving a truck.

Career 
He led 600 investigations, including those of the Malki murders, Albayrak Holding, and Adnan Oktar.

He has led raids against Sedat Peker, Alaattin Çakıcı, Sedat Şahin, Ayvaz Korkmaz, Kürşat Yılmaz, and the Ergin brothers.

Ergenekon investigation
In 2001, he led the team that interrogated Tuncay Güney, exposing a criminal network called Ergenekon. The Ergenekon investigation at the time was allegedly torpedoed due to the intervention of vested interests. Saçan suspects Veli Küçük, an Ergenekon defendant; he was found in possession of documents intended to blackmail Saçan. Since the interrogation, Saçan has been fired six times and sued 39 times (acquitted on 36 counts, as of August 2008).

In September 2008, he himself was detained on charges of being a member. He was interrogated by prosecutor Mehmet Ali Pekgüzel for nearly twelve hours, in reference to the Gülenist clique inside the police force, and the thwarting of the Ergenekon investigation in 2001.
He shares a cell with Tuncay Özkan and his former detainee, Sedat Peker.

The Fatih Second Criminal Court of First Instance sentenced Saçan to five months in prison on charges of taking confidential investigation documents into his own possession.

On 5 August 2013 he was sentenced to 14 years and six months as part of the Ergenekon trials.

References

External links 
 

Turkish law enforcement personnel
Living people
People convicted in the Ergenekon trials
Istanbul University Faculty of Law alumni
Year of birth missing (living people)